Innocents is the second and final album by American metal band Only Living Witness. It was released on February 27, 1996 on CD and audio cassette, while the band broke up in 1995.

CD version

Audio cassette version

References 

1996 albums